Park Place is a neighborhood in the western half of Norfolk, Virginia. Its boundaries are roughly Granby Street on the east, Colley Avenue on the west, 23rd Street on the south and up to (and including the southern half of) 38th Street to the north. Within these boundaries Park Place is made up of 4 historic subdivisions; Virginia Place, East Kensington, Park Place, and East Old Dominion Place.

The Park Place Historic District is a national historic district listed on the National Register of Historic Places in 2005 and enlarged in 2017. It encompasses 1,525 contributing buildings, 2 contributing sites, and 5 contributing structures in the Park Place neighborhood of Norfolk.  It is an example of streetcar suburban development in Norfolk during the late 19th and early 20th centuries. The neighborhood includes a variety of commercial, residential, industrial, and institutional buildings in a variety of popular styles including the Queen Anne and Shingle Style. Notable buildings include Batchelder and Collins (1904), J. W. Gamage and Son (1910), National Linen Service (1941), Best Repair Company (1938), Rosna Theater (1942), Newport Plaza and Theater (1930), Park Place Baptist Church (1903), Church of the Ascension (1915), Christian Temple (1922), Park Place Methodist Church (1949), Knox Presbyterian Church (1940), the Touraine (1915), Colonial Hall Apartments (1925), and Camellia Court (1914).

Park Place is a diverse socio-economic neighborhood that lies directly north of the Ghent district and directly south of Colonial Place. Park Place is one of Norfolk's oldest neighborhoods and the architecture of the homes reflects this. In recent years, residents have worked together to implement a plan of neighbors helping neighbors. A brand new YMCA, state of the art early childhood education school, and redevelopment in the 35th Business District and historic Railroad District are just some of the great things that have added value to the neighborhood. Park Place is adjacent to the Virginia Zoo, Lafayette Park and unique restaurants that have been rated some of the best in the city. Park Place is traversed by many of Norfolk's largest thoroughfares and is close to the arts, downtown, universities and the Naval base.

References

External links

Historic districts on the National Register of Historic Places in Virginia
National Register of Historic Places in Norfolk, Virginia
Queen Anne architecture in Virginia
Neighborhoods in Norfolk, Virginia